George Henry Fraser (c. 1880 – 9 December 1919) was a navigator and aircraft mechanic who flew with pilot Cedric Howell as one of the teams competing in the England to Australia air race in December 1919. Howell and Fraser's aircraft made a forced landing in the St George's Bay, Corfu; both men are presumed to have drowned as a result, although only Howell's body was ever recovered.

Personal life
Fraser's exact date of birth is not given in the sources available, but he is variously stated to have been either 39 or 40 years old at the time of his death. He was the child of Robert Fraser (died 27 March 1894, aged 46) and Mary Fraser (died 15 March 1937, aged 92). He was born in Macorna, Victoria, Australia and attended Macorna State School. On leaving school, Fraser became a bicycle and motor mechanic and, before enlisting in 1917, he worked for several years in his brother William Fraser's car import firm, Messrs Fraser and Willsford of Sydney, Australia, where he was residing at the time of his enlistment. Fraser was unmarried at the time he enlisted and at the date of his death.

Military service
Fraser enlisted as a private in the Australian Imperial Force on 12 March 1917 and was assigned, as an air mechanic, 2nd class, to the Fifth Training Squadron, Australian Flying Corps. He subsequently served in England with the Fifth Training Squadron and the No 1 School of Navigation and Bomb Dropping, Royal Air Force, gaining much experience of the maintenance and operation of bomber aircraft and of aerial navigation.

Post-war
For the six months before he started with Howell on the race to Australia, Fraser had been employed by Rolls-Royce Ltd, during which time he had become familiar with engines of the type fitted in the plane in which he was to compete.

Final flight

In August 1919 the British aircraft manufacturer Martinsyde Ltd invited Australian flying ace Captain Cedric Howell to pilot their Type A Mk.I in the forthcoming England to Australia air race. As a qualified navigator and a mechanic familiar with the Rolls-Royce engine fitted to the plane, Fraser was selected to accompany Captain Howell. Having departed from Taranto on the next stage of the flight, Howell's and Fraser's aircraft made a forced landing St George's Bay, Corfu. It was initially falsely reported, in telegram received by William Fraser, that his brother had been rescued and had arrived safely in Athens. Although the circumstances of the accident are not clear, it appears that both were alive and survived in the water but that they subsequently drowned. Only Howell's body was ever recovered. It was subsequently claimed that Howell drowned while attempting to tow Fraser to shore, since the mechanic was unable to swim.

Memorials
Fraser's name is included in the Hollybrook Memorial, Southampton, England and he is commemorated on a family headstone in White Hills Cemetery, White Hills, Victoria. His name is also included in the Australian War Memorial Roll of Honour.

See also 
 List of people who disappeared at sea

Notes
Footnotes

Citations

1880s births
1919 deaths
Australian air racers
Australian Army soldiers
Australian military personnel of World War I
Aviators killed in aviation accidents or incidents
Deaths by drowning
Missing aviators
People from Victoria (Australia)
Victims of aviation accidents or incidents in Greece
Victims of aviation accidents or incidents in 1919